Charter Communications, Inc., is an American telecommunications and mass media company with services branded as Spectrum. With over 32 million customers in 41 states, it is the second-largest cable operator in the United States by subscribers, just behind Comcast, and the third-largest pay TV operator behind Comcast and AT&T. Charter is the fifth-largest telephone provider based on number of residential lines.

In late 2012, with longtime Cablevision executive Thomas Rutledge named as their CEO, Charter relocated its corporate headquarters from St. Louis, Missouri, to Stamford, Connecticut, though kept many of its operations in St. Louis. On May 18, 2016, Charter finalized acquisition of Time Warner Cable and its sister company Bright House Networks, making it the third-largest pay television service in the United States. Charter ranked No. 70 in the 2019 Fortune 500 list of the largest United States corporations by total revenue.

History

1980–1998: Beginnings
Charter Communications CATV systems was founded in 1980 by Charles H. Leonard in Barry County, Michigan. The original Charter system headquarters and offices were located at 1001 Payne Lake Road, Yankee Springs Township, Michigan.  Leonard began a corporate partnership with Gary Wilcox and Gerry Kazma, both from Naperville, Illinois, during which Spectrum Communications (Kazma) merged with Charter Systems (1981–1983).

Through continued mergers and acquisition, Charter was consolidated in 1993 by Barry Babcock, Jerald Kent and Howard Wood, who had been former executives at Cencom Cable Television in St. Louis, Missouri. It was also incorporated in the state of Missouri in 1993.

In 1995, Charter paid about $300 million for a controlling interest in the cable television systems owned by Crown Media Holdings and acquired Cable South.

In 1997, Charter and EarthLink worked together to deliver high-speed Internet access through cable modems to Charter's customers in Los Angeles and Riverside, California.

In 1998, Paul Allen bought a controlling interest. The company paid $2.8 billion to acquire Dallas-based cable company Marcus Cable. Charter Communications had 1 million customers in 1998.

1999–2008: NASDAQ listing and acquisitions
In November 1999, the company went public, trading on the NASDAQ stock exchange. At the time, it had 3.9 million customers.

Charter completed more than 10 major acquisitions in 1999 when it:
Added 68,000 subscribers in Southern California with the purchase of four cable systems from American Cable Entertainment of Stamford, Connecticut.
Acquired 400,000 InterMedia Partners subscribers, primarily in the Southeast. As part of the deal Charter would turn over about 140,000 of its subscribers to TCI in a cable system swap.
Merged with Marcus Cable
Acquired cable systems serving 460,000 subscribers from Rifkin Acquisition Partners and InterLink Communications.
Acquired 173,000 subscribers, mostly in central Massachusetts, from New Jersey-based Greater Media Inc.
Acquired Renaissance Media Group, a New York partnership serving 130,000 customers near New Orleans, western Mississippi, and Jackson, Tennessee.
Acquired New Jersey-based Helicon Cable Communications. The systems served about 171,000 customers in eight states in the Southeast and Northeast.
Acquired Avalon Cable TV, adding 260,000 subscribers primarily in Michigan and Massachusetts.
Acquired Vista Broadband Communications in Smyrna, Georgia, adding 30,000 more customers.
Acquired Falcon Cable TV of Los Angeles. Falcon was the eighth-largest cable operator in the United States with about one million subscribers in 27 states in primarily non-urban areas.
Acquired Fanch Communications Inc. of Denver. Fanch had 547,000 subscribers in West Virginia, Pennsylvania, Michigan, Indiana, Kentucky, Louisiana, and Wisconsin.

Charter also began swapping customers with other systems to improve the geographic clustering of its systems. In December 1999, it signed a letter of intent with AT&T Corporation to swap 1.3 million cable subscribers in St. Louis as well as in Alabama, Georgia, and Missouri. In 2000, Charter Communications bought select AT&T cable markets, including Reno, Nevada, and the City of St. Louis.

In 2001, MSN and Charter signed an agreement to offer MSN content and services to Charter's broadband customers. In the same year, Charter received awards, including the Outstanding Corporate Growth Award from the Association for Corporate Growth, the R.E. "Ted" Turner Innovator of the Year Award from the Southern Cable Telecommunications Association, and the Fast 50 Award for Growth from the St. Louis Regional Chamber and Growth Association.

In 2008, Charter stock failed to meet NASDAQ standards and was given warning to comply by October 13 or request an extension.

Also in 2008, it acquired the cable-television franchise and service for the Cerritos and Ventura, California, areas from Wave Broadband.

2009: Bankruptcy and emergence
In February 2009, Charter Communications announced that it planned to file for Chapter 11 of the United States Bankruptcy Code on or before April 1, 2009. The action would allow Charter to pay its debt obligations, and cancel its obligations to shareholders. Private equity firm Apollo Management expected to own most of Charter's shares after the bankruptcy. Charter filed for a prearranged bankruptcy on March 28, 2009. The company expected the financial restructuring to reduce its debt by $8 billion, as well as adding $3 billion of new investment, and refinancing other debt.

On November 30, 2009, its bankruptcy plan was approved, which extinguished its stock and cut approximately $8 billion in debt. That day, Charter emerged from bankruptcy despite many of its creditors' objections over its bankruptcy plan.

2010–2012: NASDAQ re-listing; leadership change

On September 14, 2010, Charter Class A common stock was re-listed on NASDAQ under the symbol "CHTR".

In 2011, Microsoft co-founder Paul Allen stepped down as chairman and from the board of directors' seat, but at the time remained the largest single shareholder. Also in that year, Charter signed a multi-year deal with TiVo to deliver content via its platform.

Thomas M. Rutledge was appointed as a director and president and chief executive officer effective February 13, 2012.

The same year, Charter priced $1.25 billion senior debt, offering to pay down short- and long-term debt.

2013–2014: Purchase of Optimum West; Liberty Media investment
On February 8, 2013, Charter announced an agreement to acquire some former Bresnan Communications systems from Cablevision in a transaction worth US$1.63 billion. The deal brought Charter cable systems to 375,000 customers in Colorado's mountains and Western Slope, as well as in Utah, Wyoming and Montana.

Approximately one month later, on March 19, 2013, Charter announced that Liberty Media, a company controlled by former TCI CEO John C. Malone, would be acquiring a 27.3% ownership interest in the company, making it the company's largest single shareholder, largely through the purchase of interests held by investment funds following Charter's 2009 restructuring. In November 2014, Liberty's holdings in Charter as well as a small minority interest in Time Warner Cable were spun off as a separate holding company named Liberty Broadband Corporation, which as of early 2015 was 47.1% controlled by Malone.

2014–2017: Acquisition of Time Warner Cable and Bright House Networks
On January 13, 2014, Charter Communications said it was interested in buying its larger rival Time Warner Cable. After three previous attempts to buy and merge with the company, all of which failed, Charter's chief executive officer Thomas Rutledge wrote in an open letter to Time Warner Cable's chief executive officer Robert Marcus stating, "I believe we have a significant opportunity to put our companies together in a way that will create maximum, long-term value for shareholders and employees of both companies". The $132.50 per share offer, just above TWC's closing price at $132.40 on January 13, was rejected.

On February 13, 2014, Time Warner Cable accepted an offer of $158.82 per share from Comcast, avoiding a hostile takeover situation from Charter.

On April 28, 2014, Comcast and Charter announced that, assuming Comcast's merger with Time Warner Cable was successful, Charter would acquire 1.4 million Comcast/Time Warner Cable customers, bringing Charter's subscriber total to 30 million and making Charter, by its own count, the second-largest cable operator in the country. In addition to the 1.4 million divested subscribers, Comcast also agreed to swap 1.6 million subscribers with Charter in an even, tax-efficient exchange whose intent is to improve the geographic spread of both companies. In a third part of the agreement, Comcast would spin off 2.5 million subscribers into a new publicly traded company in which Charter would hold a 33% stake – with an option to eventually own the whole company – and former Time Warner Cable shareholders would hold a 67% stake.

In late March 2015, Charter announced plans to purchase Bright House Networks from Advance/Newhouse for $10.4 billion in a combination of cash and equities convertible to Charter stock. The deal was contingent on, among other approvals, the completion of Charter's transactions with Comcast, and the expiration of Time Warner Cable's right of first offer to buy Bright House itself (which was not expected to be exercised in light of the merger with Comcast). However, facing potential difficulties in reaching regulatory approval, Comcast called off its merger with Time Warner Cable in April 2015.

On May 26, 2015, Charter and Time Warner Cable announced that they had entered into a definitive agreement for Charter to merge with Time Warner Cable in a deal valued at $78.7 billion. Charter also confirmed that it would continue with its proposed acquisition of Bright House Networks under slightly modified terms. The deal was subject to regulatory approval, although the deal was expected to face less scrutiny from the FCC than the Comcast/TWC deal, as the companies were relatively smaller, and their media holdings are not as extensive as those of Comcast. The TWC and Bright House systems were to be migrated to Charter's Spectrum brand following the conclusion of the merger.

Liberty Broadband will invest a further $5 billion in Charter and will ultimately hold about 20% ownership in the combined entity. Advance/Newhouse will own about 14%, and other current Time Warner Cable shareholders are expected to hold a combined 44% stake. The merger was approved by the Department of Justice and FCC on April 25, 2016; it is subject to conditions, including a requirement that Charter must not implement usage-based billing, nor use its dominant position in the market to impact the online video industry – which includes a prohibition on charging for interconnections. Charter was also required to expand its services to 2 million new households, with at least 1 million being in markets where competing providers operate.

The merger was completed on May 18, 2016. The purchase made Charter the third-largest pay television company in the United States, behind AT&T and Comcast (the former having completed its merger with DirecTV in mid-2015).

2017–present: Post-TWC acquisition

On January 26, 2017, it was reported that Verizon Communications was in talks with Charter to discuss a possible buyout. President and CEO of Liberty Media, Greg Maffei said that they were not interested in the deal. The deal was rejected around the end of May 2017. Charter claimed that the deal was too low for them to accept, and Charter's largest shareholder Liberty Media stated that they were not ready to sell.

In March 2017 under new FCC leadership, Charter's regulatory conditions were changed to require that Charter expand its services to 2 million households that are not currently served by any broadband provider, as opposed to requiring one million of these households to be in areas served by a competitor. The decision was made under goals by new chairman Ajit Pai to increase the availability of broadband in rural areas not served by high-speed Internet, but was criticized for maintaining oligopolies rather than encouraging wider competition.

In May 2017, it was reported that Charter and Comcast had entered into an agreement to "explore working together in a number of potential operational areas in the wireless space" in respect to mobile virtual network operators (MVNOs); both providers have agreements with Verizon Wireless to re-sell its services, and Comcast announced that it would begin to do so under the brand Xfinity Mobile later in the year. The agreement includes a provision, lasting for one year, that requires the companies to receive consent from each other before performing wireless-related acquisitions or mergers.

On June 21, 2017, it was reported that Charter was in talks to buy Cox Communications.

On March 28, 2017, IBEW Local 3 went on strike, representing 1,800 employees. The company has proposed moving independently managed health and pension benefits to its own company plans, which union members consider would include drastic cuts for them and their families and loss of job security. No significant progress has been made, and the strike continues as of late December 2018.

On March 12, 2018, it was reported that Softbank had purchased 5% of Charter's stock on the open market.

Threatened revocation of New York cable franchises
In June 2018, the New York Public Service Commission fined Charter $2 million for failing to meet obligations it agreed to as conditions of its acquisition of Time Warner Cable. Charter was required to expand broadband service to at least 145,000 unserved or underserved residential units over 4 years, with a minimum of 36,250 new units per-year. The company was accused of making false statements in its progress reports, with an audit finding that Charter fraudulently declared at least 14,000 addresses already served by the company as being "new" deployments. The commission threatened the possibility of further regulatory remedies, including revocation of its cable franchises.

On July 27, 2018, the NYPSC voted to retroactively reverse its approval of Charter's acquisition of TWC, thus revoking its franchises in the state of New York. The commission cited Charter's repeated failures to meet deadlines on expansion promised as part of the TWC purchase, "attempts to skirt obligations to serve rural communities", and "purposeful obfuscation of its performance and compliance obligations to the Commission and its customers." Within 60 days, Charter was to submit a plan to divest and migrate its New York state cable operations (which serve around 2 million customers) to new owners.

Charter CEO Tom Rutledge threatened legal action against the commission. The company was later granted repeated extensions of its deadline.

In April 2019, Charter agreed to new conditions, under which it must complete its expansion of 145,000 new premises by September 30, 2021 (being credited for 64,827 premises up until December 2018), all of which must be outside of New York City, and are subject to milestone requirements. Charter must also contribute $12 million to a fund "for broadband expansion projects at locations to be selected by the Department and the Broadband Program Office", with half of this funding to be provided to either Charter or a competitor via a competitive bidding process.

Streaming venture 
In April 2022, Charter and Comcast announced plans for a 50/50 venture to develop a streaming platform. As part of this effort, Comcast would license its Flex streaming platform and offer up the XClass TVs and the Xumo streaming service.

Operations

Current operations

Coverage

Charter Communications offers service to an estimated 32 million people in 41 states with significant coverage in 48 states.

In November 2013, the company announced the re-branding of its residential services to Charter Spectrum which encompassed an upgrade to an all-digital network for its video, voice and broadband services. The company relied heavily on a predominantly coaxial cable-based network. The newer fiber-optic service-delivery system provides higher bandwidth speeds than are available with its coaxial cable infrastructure.

The television markets served by Charter Spectrum are as follows:

Call centers
On May 2, 2006, the company announced it would restructure seven of its call centers in the United States in the following locations:

St. Louis, Missouri – Residential HSI/Phone Support, July 31, 2006; converted into a Charter Phone service call center
Bay City, Michigan – September 2006; converted into a Charter Dispatch center
Birmingham, Alabama – December 2006; converted into a Charter Dispatch center
Fort Worth, Texas – December 1, 2006; shuttered
Irwindale, California – December 2009; restructured
Brookfield, Connecticut – March 2007; restructured
Kingsport, Tennessee – March 2007; converted to Dispatch Center with location change
Amherst, Nova Scotia – December 2010; third-party contract, Teletech, not renewed
Louisville, Kentucky – Residential HSI/Phone Support, Charter Business technical support, Network Operations Center

Orders completed online or through retail partners with Charter Communications are directed to a call center located in Tempe, Arizona, operated by Teletech (Direct Alliance). This call center has inbound/outbound sales agents, as well as online chat agents. Outsourced call centers were implemented in 2006 and are located in Canada, Honduras and the Philippines.

Charter-owned call centers are located in St. Louis, Missouri (telephone service support center); Billings, Montana;  Greenville, South Carolina; Vancouver, Washington; Fond du Lac, Wisconsin; Walker, Michigan; Rochester, Minnesota; Worcester, Massachusetts, and Louisville, Kentucky (the largest call center across the company), with Heathrow, Florida, handling the bulk of video, high-speed data, and telephone billing and customer service contacts.

In 2016, Charter announced that it would be adding 20,000 United States-based jobs, with many of these jobs being call center jobs.

Former operations
On March 27, 2006, Charter announced that it would sell cable systems serving approximately 43,000 customers in Nevada, Colorado, New Mexico, and Utah to Orange Broadband Holding Company (since renamed Baja Broadband).

Charter also sold cable systems in West Virginia and Virginia to Cebridge Connections (later Suddenlink Communications and now known as Altice USA) and cable systems in Kentucky and Illinois to New Wave Communications. The company eventually returned to those areas (excluding Illinois) in 2016 when it acquired Time Warner Cable.

On October 14, 2008, the Fairmont Sentinel reported that Charter was selling parts of their system to Midcontinent Communications, including Charter's offices in Bemidji and International Falls, Minnesota. Starting February 1, 2009, Midcontinent took over some of Charter's cable system in Minnesota including Balaton, Bemidji, Canby, Ely, Fairmont, International Falls, Littlefork, Sherburn, and surrounding communities. Other areas in Minnesota would have sold to Comcast, but the deal fell through.

On October 22, 2010, Charter sold 32 head-ends serving 65,000 customers in Alabama, Arkansas, Georgia, Louisiana, Missouri, and Texas to Cobridge Communications.

Criticism

In 2007, PC World ranked Charter's cable Internet service as the worst among 14 major Internet service providers. In addition, Charter High-Speed was rated 19th out of 22 cable ISPs on dslreports.com, and Consumer Reports indicated in its February 2008 issue that Charter's television/Internet/telephone bundle collectively was the worst of all major national carriers.

It was reported by Tony Bradle on about.com that Charter Communications redirected error pages and Windows Live Search results to a Charter search page without notifying customers. Users may opt out of redirection by clicking a link from the Charter search page; however, the opt-out link saves a cookie on the customer's computer, so deleting cookies will require the user to opt out again. Other providers such as Cox and AT&T have a similar page as well.

It was reported that on January 21, 2008, during a routine sweep of inactive accounts, Charter accidentally and irretrievably deleted the email accounts of approximately 14,000 customers. The company since decided to give a $150 account credit to each affected user. In May 2008, Charter announced that it planned to monitor web sites visited by its high-speed Internet customers via a partnership with targeted advertising firm NebuAd. Charter dropped the program in June following public backlash.

Lawsuits
In 2002, the United States Department of Justice investigated the company, leading to the indictment of four former executives in 2005 for improper financial reporting related primarily to the inflation of cable subscriber numbers to improve financial figures.

In 2004, Charter settled a class-action lawsuit concerning the questionable financial reporting associated with the U.S. Department of Justice's 2002 investigation and subsequent indictment of four former executives. Current and former shareholders (and their attorneys) were awarded $144 million as well as an agreement from Charter to maintain and implement proper corporate governance measures.

In June 2010, Charter settled a class-action lawsuit for $18 million concerning wage and overtime claims for current and former field technicians in California, Missouri, Michigan, Minnesota, Illinois, Nevada, Washington, Oregon and Nebraska.

In December 2013, a complaint was filed by Steelhead Licensing LLC for patent infringement of U.S. Patent 8082318; it is described as "Controlling service requests transmitted from a client to a server".

In January 2016, the National Association of African-American Owned Media and Byron Allen's Entertainment Studios filed a $10 billion civil rights lawsuit against Charter, claiming discrimination for Charter's refusal to pick up Allen's eight-channel suite of networks (which mainly carry ES content already syndicated through local television stations and paid programming); Allen and the NAAAOM (which has an Entertainment Studios executive as its head) have already filed the same type of suit against several other providers.

In May 2016, Charter reached a settlement with the FCC regarding allegations by Zoom Telephonics that, in 2012, following the introduction of new rate plans and the introduction of DOCSIS 3.0, it had begun to bar new subscribers or those switching to the new plans from utilizing customer-purchased modems. Although Charter ended this practice in 2014 and began to allow certain certified modems to be used, Zoom argued that the company was still deliberately limiting options by requiring the modems to undergo a testing protocol concerning factors beyond  whether they cause interference or unauthorized receipt of service (the only two factors which providers may use to restrict allowable modems under FCC policy). Charter paid a $640,000 fine, and agreed to use a shorter testing process allowing the use of any DOCSIS 3.0-compatible modem, and send compliance reports to the FCC every six months and whenever a modem is blacklisted.

On February 1, 2017, Charter was sued by the Attorney General of New York for failing to provide its advertised Internet speeds to customers in areas that Charter acquired by the purchase of Time Warner Cable. The company agreed to a $174.2 million settlement, including both refunds of $75 to affected subscribers (with an additional $75 to those who rented the defective modem hardware for at least 24 months), and offers of complimentary subscriptions to services such as HBO (3 months) or Showtime (6 months) to all subscribers with an internet and television bundle.

On August 28, 2017, Charter agreed to a $225,000 settlement in the state of Missouri over violations of telemarketing and No-call list laws.

In July 2022, a jury in Dallas County, Texas ordered Charter to pay $375 million in compensatory damages plus $7 billion in punitive damages to the family of a woman who was murdered by a Spectrum technician. Lawyers for the woman's family contended that "systemic safety failures" at Spectrum led to the murder, and that Spectrum forged documents to force the case into arbitration instead of a jury trial, a claim that Charter denies. , Charter plans to appeal the ruling.

See also

List of United States telephone companies
List of cable television companies
List of Connecticut companies
Spectrum Sports
Spectrum News
SportsNet LA

References

External links

 "Charter Communications executives sentenced in accounting schemes", The Detroit News, Associated Press, April 23, 2005

 
1993 establishments in Missouri
1999 initial public offerings
2010 initial public offerings
Cable network groups in the United States
Cable television companies of the United States
Companies based in Stamford, Connecticut
Companies listed on the Nasdaq
Companies that filed for Chapter 11 bankruptcy in 2009
Internet service providers of the United States
Mass media companies established in 1993
Mass media companies of the United States
Telecommunications companies established in 1993
Telecommunications companies of the United States